The Tiger Hill Pagoda, more officially the Yunyan Pagoda (Suzhou Wu: Yuin nge zy thaeh,  or ; Suzhou Wu: Hou chieu thaeh), also sometimes translated as Huqiu Tower, is a Chinese pagoda situated on Tiger Hill in Suzhou city, Jiangsu Province of Eastern China. It is nicknamed the 'Leaning Tower of China'.

History
The primary pagoda of the former Yunyan Temple, which was founded in 327 and rebuilt for the last time in 1871. The temple suffered damage in successive wars and most of the temple was destroyed during the Second Sino-Japanese War. Some elements of the temple such as the formal entrance, the Yunyan Pagoda, and several other buildings and smaller shrines have survived, and now stand as landmarks throughout Tiger Hill Park.

Construction of the pagoda began in 907 CE, during the later period of the Five Dynasties period, at a time when Suzhou was ruled by the Wuyue Kingdom. Construction was completed in 961 CE during the Song Dynasty.

The uppermost stories of the pagoda were built as an addition during the reign of the Chongzhen Emperor (1628–1644), the last emperor of the Ming Dynasty.

Description
The Yunyan Pagoda rises to a height of 47 m (154 ft). The pagoda has seven stories and is octagonal in plan, and was built with a masonry structure designed to imitate wooden-structured pagodas prevalent at the time.

Leaning tower

In more than a thousand years the pagoda has gradually slanted due to forces of nature. Now the top and bottom of the tower vary by 2.32 meters. However, the pagoda leans roughly 3 degrees due to the cracking of two supporting columns.

The pagoda leans because the foundation is originally half rock and the other half is on soil. In 1957, efforts were made to stabilize the pagoda and prevent further leaning. Concrete was also pumped into the soil forming a stronger foundation.

During the reinforcement process, a stone casket containing Buddhist scriptures was found. The container had an inscription noting the completion date of the pagoda as the seventeenth day of the twelfth month of the second year of the Jianlong era (961 CE).

Present day
The Yunyan Pagoda is a designated Major National Historical and Cultural Site in Jiangsu.  As of September 2010, public access to the top of the tower is no longer allowed.

Notes

See also

Song Dynasty architecture
Major national historical and cultural sites (Jiangsu)

References
 

Buddhist temples in Suzhou
Pagodas in China
Inclined towers
Major National Historical and Cultural Sites in Jiangsu
Religious buildings and structures completed in the 960s
Towers completed in the 10th century
Song dynasty architecture
10th-century Buddhist temples